Małgorzata Birbach (born 17 February 1960 in Brodnica, Kuyavian-Pomeranian) is a former female long-distance runner from Poland, who represented her native country at the 1992 Summer Olympics in Barcelona, Spain. She set her personal best (2:28:11) in the classic distance in 1992.

Achievements
All results regarding marathon, unless stated otherwise

References
sports-reference

1960 births
Living people
Polish female long-distance runners
Athletes (track and field) at the 1992 Summer Olympics
Olympic athletes of Poland
People from Brodnica County
Sportspeople from Kuyavian-Pomeranian Voivodeship